Slatina v Rožni Dolini is a settlement in the City Municipality of Celje in eastern Slovenia. It lies on the northern outskirts of Celje. The area is part of the traditional region of Styria. It is now included with the rest of the municipality in the Savinja Statistical Region.

Name
The name of the settlement was changed from Slatina to Slatina v Rožni dolini in 1955.

References

External links
Slatina v Rožni Dolini on Geopedia

Populated places in the City Municipality of Celje